Dubai Fencing Club was founded in 2002 by Bulgarian former modern pentathlete Mihail Gueorguiev Kouzev. It is located in Dubai in the United Arab Emirates.

As of 2006, the club met in the Quay Health Club in the Mina Al Salaam Hotel. Mihail Kouzev is still the club's head coach.

References

External links 
 Dubai Fencing Club homepage

Fencing clubs
Fencing in the United Arab Emirates
Sport in Dubai
Sports clubs established in 2002
2002 establishments in the United Arab Emirates